Elizabeth Essex-Cohen (1940-2004) was an Australian physicist who worked in global positioning satellite physics and was amongst the first women in Australia to be awarded a PhD in physics.

Early life and education 
Elizabeth Annette Essex-Cohen, née Essex, was educated at Grafton High. She subsequently did a PhD in Physics at Australia's University of New England, investigating ionospheric irregularities under Frank Hibberd, graduating in 1966. Essex-Cohen was the fourth woman in Australia to receive a PhD in physics.

Career and impact 
After graduating her PhD, Elizabeth Essex-Cohen worked at University of the West Indies and James Cook University before taking up a lectureship position in space physics at La Trobe University in 1968. She remained at La Trobe for the remainder of her career, though in 1974 and 1978/9 she had simultaneous positions at the US Air Force Geophysics Laboratory as part of her GPS research. Her initial work focused on the use of radio wave reflection to study irregularities in the ionosphere.

Her work on radio transmission through the ionosphere led to some of her best-known work in communications between ground and satellites. In the early US Air force's development of GPS (then called Navstar), she was the only Australian involved in the design. Her collaborations with Australian Antarctic Division and the Co-operative Research Centre for Satellite Systems lead to her having a significant role in the development of Australia's FedSat satellite (active 2002-2007).

Death 
Essex-Cohen became hospitalised for mesothelioma in December 2002. After a brief remission which enabled her to attend a Wireless Science conference, she died in March 2004. Tributes included a special session of the (International) Beacon Satellite Group.

References

External links 
 Elizabeth Essex-Cohen's publications

1940 births
2004 deaths
University of New England (Australia) alumni
Academic staff of La Trobe University
University of the West Indies academics
Academic staff of James Cook University
20th-century Australian physicists
20th-century Australian women scientists
Australian women physicists